Mary Ann M'Clintock or Mary Ann McClintock (1800-1884) is best known for her role in the formation of the women's suffrage movement, as well as abolitionism.

Life
M'Clintock was born on February 20, 1800, in Burlington, New Jersey. She was married to Thomas M'Clintock and they were both invested in their Quaker backgrounds, and social reform. Thomas provided for their four daughters and their son by working as a druggist and minister. From the beginning of their marriage in 1820 the lived in Philadelphia until 1836 when they moved to Waterloo, New York. By 1833 Marry Ann was very active in the anti-slavery movements in Philadelphia and was one of the founding members of the Philadelphia Female Anti-Slavery Society. She worked closely with abolitionist Lucretia Mott. Once moved to Waterloo, Mary Ann took a more active role in the women's suffragist movement. Mary Ann had a hand in organizing the Seneca Falls Convention, held in July 1848. She and her daughters Elizabeth and Mary Ann also attended the convention and signed the Declaration of Sentiments. The base of the convention was to present the Declaration of Sentiments, this document drafted by women such as Elizabeth Cady Stanton and Lucretia Mott at the kitchen table of Mary Ann M'Clintock and outlines equal opportunities among men and women. The Declaration of Sentiments was modeled after the Declaration of Independence and was the fuel that started the fire that was the suffragist movement which lasted until 1920. However, Mary Ann never got to vote. In 1856 she retired back to Philadelphia and died there on May 21, 1884, at the age of 84. She is buried in the Fair Hill Burial Ground in Philadelphia.

See also
List of suffragists and suffragettes
M'Clintock House
Women's Rights National Historical Park

References

External links

1800 births
1884 deaths
American Quakers
American suffragists
Activists from Philadelphia
American abolitionists
Quaker abolitionists
Women civil rights activists